John Lennon was a British singer-songwriter and peace activist, best known as one of the four principal members of the Beatles. His first three studio albums are experiments with Yoko Ono using tape loops, interviews, musique concrète, and other avant-garde performance techniques. Lennon also released one live album and three singles under his own name before the break-up of the Beatles.

After the break-up of the Beatles, Lennon began his solo career with Plastic Ono Band, released simultaneously with Ono's album of the same name. He released the album Imagine the following year, which became his most critical and commercial success. His 1972 political themed album Some Time in New York City received scathing reviews and performed poorly commercially. Lennon's next two albums, Mind Games (1973) and Walls and Bridges (1974) were better received and had more commercial success. In 1975, Lennon released his covers album Rock 'n' Roll before retiring from music to focus on raising his newborn son Sean. He returned to the music industry in 1980 with the album Double Fantasy, but was murdered three weeks after its release. Following his death, the 1984 album Milk and Honey was posthumously released.

In 2020, to celebrate what would have been Lennon's 80th birthday, Ono and his son Sean released the box set Gimme Some Truth. The Ultimate Mixes, which contained newly remixed versions of 36 of Lennon's songs. In 2018 and 2021, super deluxe box-sets of Imagine and John Lennon/Plastic Ono Band were released.

By 2012, Lennon's solo album sales in the US had exceeded 14 million units. He had 25 number-one singles on the US Billboard Hot 100 chart as a writer, co-writer or performer.

Albums

Studio albums

Live albums

Compilation albums

Box sets

Singles

Videography

Home videos

Music videos

Collaborations and other appearances

As session musician and producer

See also
 The Beatles discography
A Toot and a Snore in '74

References
Footnotes

Citations

Rock music discographies
Discographies of British artists